This is an alphabetical list of documentary films with Wikipedia articles. The earliest documentary listed is Fred Ott's Sneeze (1894), which is also the first motion picture ever copyrighted in North America. The term documentary was first used in 1926 by filmmaker John Grierson as a term to describe films that document reality. For other lists, see :Category:Documentary films by country and :Category:Documentaries by topic.

0–9

A

B

C

D

E

F

G

H

I

J

K

L

M

N

O

P

Q

R

S

T

U

V

W

X

Y

Z

See also
 List of environmental films
 List of documentary films about agriculture
 List of documentary films about war

References

 Documentary